Mirage Island is a rocky island  long lying  west of Cape Mousse on the coast of Antarctica. It was charted in 1950 by the French Antarctic Expedition and so named by them because mirages were frequently observed in the vicinity of the island.

See also 
 List of Antarctic and sub-Antarctic islands

References

Islands of Adélie Land